Herbert Charles Denton "Frenchie" Nicholson was a horse racing jockey and trainer.

Nicholson acquired his nickname after having been apprenticed in the French city of Chantilly, moving to a stable yard in Epsom to continue his training. He had a major success early on in his career, winning the 1936 Champion Hurdle on Victor Norman. He won the 1942 Cheltenham Gold Cup on Medoc II before the race was suspended for the remainder of the 2nd World War. Nicholson also rode the renowned Irish racehorse, Golden Miller. In 1946-47 he shared the Jockey's Championship with Fred Rimell.

Following the war he worked as a trainer and was prominent in the training of jockeys both for steeplechase and flat racing. He trained, amongst others, Pat Eddery, Walter Swinburn, Mouse Morris, Brough Scott and Paul Cook at his Prestbury stables.

Nicholson's son, David was also a jockey and trainer.

References

English jockeys
British racehorse trainers
English expatriates in France